

This is a list of the National Register of Historic Places listings in Boone County, Missouri.

This is intended to be a complete list of the properties and districts on the National Register of Historic Places in Boone County, Missouri, United States. Latitude and longitude coordinates are provided for many National Register properties and districts; these locations may be seen together in a map.

There are 51 properties and districts listed on the National Register in the county, including 1 National Historic Landmark.

Current listings

|}

See also
Boone County Historical Society
List of cemeteries in Boone County, Missouri
List of National Historic Landmarks in Missouri
National Register of Historic Places listings in Missouri

References

 
Boone

National Register of Historic Places